The Bulgarian emerald, Corduliochlora borisi, is a species of dragonfly in the family Corduliidae, and the only species in the genus Corduliochlora. It is found in Bulgaria, Greece, and Turkey. Its natural habitat is rivers. It is threatened by habitat loss. The species is named after Boris Marinov. It was formerly treated as a member of the genus Somatochlora.

References

Sources

Corduliidae
Taxonomy articles created by Polbot
Insects described in 2001
Taxobox binomials not recognized by IUCN